Asiemut is a Canadian documentary film depicting the  cycling and philosophical journey of a young French Canadian couple from Mongolia to India. It was entirely filmed, directed and produced by Olivier Higgins and Mélanie Carrier. Asiemut has won 35 prizes in festivals around the world.

Synopsis 

Asiemut chronicles the 8000 km journey of Olivier Higgins and Mélanie Carrier. 

Riding their bicycles and pedaling through Asia,  Olivier and Mélanie traveled from Mongolia to Kolkata, at the mouth of the Ganges in India, passing through Xinjiang, the Taklamakan Desert, Tibet and Nepal.  Along the way, they discover the world, but over all, they discover themselves.  Who are they?  What do they want?  What is their place in this world? Maybe, between the encounters, obstacles and the discovery, this daring journey made them reflect... Do we not all have a common "Asiemut"?

Significance of the title
"Asiemut" is a variation on the word azimuth, the direction taken when following a compass, or metaphorically, the direction taken when following one's life journey, together with an allusion to the continent of Asia where the journey was made.

Impact

The film inspired Bill and Stephanie A. Frans to undertake their own long-distance cycle journey.

Awards 

Asiemut has won 35 awards in film festivals around the world, such as the "Oscar of the Oscar" of mountain and adventure films in 2008 in Italy. Asiemut was part of the Banff World Tour and has been screened in more than 40 different countries.

2008  Grand Prize over all, Cervino CineMountain Film Festival, Italy 
2008  Public Grand Prize, La Rochelle Festival du Film d'Aventure, France   
2008  Grand Prix du Public, International Mountain Film Festival of Slovenia
2008  Grand Prix du Festival, Festival Planète Couleur, France 
2007  Festival Grand Prize, Graz International Mountain and Culture Film Festival, Austria  
2007  Festival Grand Prize, Tegernsee International Mountain Film Festival, Germany 
2007  Public Grand Prize, Tegernsee International Mountain Film Festival, Germany
2007  Jury's Special Prize, Danish Adventure Film Festival, Denmark 
2007  Golden Frame Award, Explorer's Film Festival, Poland 
2007  People Choice Award, Dundee Mountain Film Festival, Scotland 
2007  People Choice Award, Festival Explorimages, France
2007  Festival Grand Prize, Williamstown Mountain Film Festival, USA 
2007  Festival Grand Prize, Teplice Mountain Film Festival 2007, Czech Republic
2007  Public Grand Prize, Festival International du Film Des Diablerets, Switzerland 
2007  Jury's Special Prize, Festival International du Film Des Diablerets, Switzerland
2007  Banskî Tourism Award, International Mountain Film Festival of Bulgaria 
2007  Best Adventure Film, InkaFest, Perù
2007  Best Adventure Film, Squamish International Mountain Film Festival, Canada
2007  Festival's Grand Prize,  Vanka Regule Festival, Croatia 
2007  Special Jury Mention, International Festival of Mountain Film, Slovakia 
2007  People Choice Award, Festival des Films d'Aventure de La Réunion
2007  Most Inspiring Film Prize, Boulder Adventure Film Festival, USA
2007  Public Choice Award, Wanaka Mountain Film Festival, New-Zealand
2007  Grand Prize-Best Film, Mountain Film Festival of Slovakia
2007  People Choice Award, Festivale Internationale des Films D'Aventure de Val D'Isère, France
2007  Prix ESPOIR du Jury, Festival Internationale des Films D'Aventure de Val D'Isère, France
2007  Grand Prize- Best Film, Vancouver International Mountain Film Festival, Canada
2007  Grand Prize- Best Film, Fort William Mountain Film Festival, Scotland
2007  Best Film on Mountain Sport, Flagstaff Mountain Film Festival, USA
2007  People Choice Award, Banff International Mountain Film Festival, Canada
2007  Special Jury Award, Banff International Mountain Film Festival, Canada
2007  Grandvalira & Silver Edelweiss, Festival Internationale des Films de Montagne de Torello, Spain 
2006  New Creator Prize, Festival Internationale des Films d'Aventure de Montréal, Canada 
2006  New Creator Prize, Festival Internationale des Films de Montagne d'Autrans, France
2006  Special Jury Award, International Adventure Film Festival of Dijon, France

References

External links 
Official Website (english)

Canadian documentary films
Documentary films about cycling
2006 films
French-language Canadian films
2000s Canadian films